WNTB (93.7 FM) is a radio station. Licensed to Topsail Beach, North Carolina, USA, it serves the Wilmington, North Carolina area.

The 93.7 frequency was previously home to WBNE, later at 103.7 FM.

From 2007 to 2020 WNTB simulcast WLTT, later WUDE. The Big Talker was a Fox News Affiliate. WNTB and WLTT 106.3 FM, Bolivia, simulcast to 5 counties in southeastern North Carolina as part of the Sea-Comm Media station group.

The station was owned by Sea-Comm, Inc.

External links
 
 

NTB